Sheffield United Football Club is an English professional football club who play at Bramall Lane in Sheffield.  They were formed in 1889 and played their first competitive match in October of that year, when they entered the first qualifying round of the FA Cup. Since then more than 1,000 players have made a competitive first-team appearance for the club, of whom almost 200 players have made at least 100 appearances (including substitute appearances); those players are listed here.

Overview
Defender and at times captain Joe Shaw remains the club's record appearance maker, playing over 700 games for the club between 1944 and 1966. The only other players who have made over 600 appearances for The Blades are Shaw's teammate and England goalkeeper Alan Hodgkinson, and forward Alan Woodward who played from 1964 to 1978.  United's leading goalscorer is 'Young' Harry Johnson (his similarly named father had also played for the club) who remains the only player to have scored over 200 times for The Blades during his fifteen-year tenure from 1916 to 1931.

The first player to play 100 competitive games for the club was the team's first goal keeper Charlie Howlett, whilst the most recent player to achieve the feat is striker Chris Porter who reached that milestone in March 2014. Of the current squad Ryan Flynn, and Neill Collins feature on this list.

Explanation of list
Players are listed in alphabetical order of their surname. Appearances, substitute appearances and goals are included but wartime matches and friendlies are excluded. Further information on competitions/seasons which are regarded as eligible for appearance stats are provided below (dependent on the years at which the player was at the club), and if any data is not available for any of these competitions an appropriate note should be added to the table.

Appearances
Games included in the stats include appearances in:
Midland Football League, Northern League, English Football League/Premier League
Test matches and play-off matches
FA Cup, Football League Cup, Football League Trophy, Football League Group Cup, Texaco Cup, Anglo-Scottish Cup, Anglo-Italian Cup, Watney Cup
Friendly matches, exhibition games, and pre-season tournaments are excluded from the figures.  Games played during both World Wars are considered friendlies and therefore are also not counted.

Table headers
Nationality – If a player played international football, the country/countries he played for are shown. Otherwise, the player's nationality is given as their country of birth.
Sheffield United career – The year of the player's first appearance for Sheffield United to the year of his last appearance.  Where a player had more than one spell at the club these are listed chronologically.
Starts – The number of games started.
Sub – The number of games played as a substitute.
Total – The total number of games played, both as a starter and as a substitute.

Key
Playing positions: GK = Goalkeeper; DF = Defender; MF = Midfielder; FW = Forward
  Players with this colour and symbol in the "Name" column are currently signed to Sheffield United.

List of players

Club captains

See also
List of Sheffield United F.C. players (25–99 appearances)

References
General

Specific

Players
 
Sheffield United
Association football player non-biographical articles